Gertrude Caton Thompson,  (1 February 1888 – 18 April 1985) was an English archaeologist at a time when participation by women in the discipline was uncommon. Much of her archaeological work was conducted in Egypt. However, she also worked on expeditions in Zimbabwe, Malta, and South Arabia. Her notable contributions to the field of archaeology include creating a technique for excavating archaeological sites and information on Paleolithic to Predynastic civilizations in Zimbabwe and Egypt. Caton Thompson held many official positions in organizations such as the Prehistoric Society and the Royal Anthropological Institute.

Early life
Gertrude Caton Thompson was born to William Caton Thompson and Ethel Page in 1888 in London, England, and attended private schools in Paris and in Eastbourne, including the Links School, run by Miss Hawtrey.  Her interest in archaeology began on a trip to Egypt with her mother in 1911, followed by a series of lectures on Ancient Greece given by Sarah Paterson at the British Museum. An inheritance received in 1912 helped ensure her financial independence and support her later excavations. Caton Thompson's first experience in the field came in 1915 working as a bottle washer in an excavation in France. During World War I, she worked for the British Ministry of Shipping as part of which she attended the Paris Peace Conference in 1919.  In 1921 Caton Thompson embarked on studies at University College London where she was taught by Margaret Murray, Flinders Petrie and Dorothea Bate, excavating in Upper Egypt during the winter of that year . The following year she began attending courses at Newnham College, Cambridge, before joining further excavations in Egypt with Petrie and Guy Brunton in 1924.

Work in Malta
In 1921, along with Margaret Murray, Gertrude Caton Thompson helped in the excavation of the megalithic temple of Borg en Nadur near St. George's Bay in Malta. Her responsibilities included investigating the caves near the temple searching for neanderthal skulls as evidence for a land bridge between Malta and the continent of Africa. Though she did not find evidence to support this theory, the excavation yielded other notable artifacts, such as Bronze Age pottery that closely paralleled Sicilian styles of the same period.

Work in Egypt
During the 1920s she worked as an archaeologist, primarily in Egypt for the British School of Archaeology Egypt, although she also conducted fieldwork in Malta. In Egypt she participated in excavations at a number of sites including Abydos, El-Badari, and Qau el Kebir. Caton Thompson took a special interest in all aspects of Prehistoric Egypt and was one of the first archaeologists to look at the full-time spectrum from the Palaeolithic through to Predynastic Egypt. Caton Thompson not only found a number of archaeological artifacts from Egypt, she also organized their display in the Egyptian Exhibition in England. Many of these finds are now in the British Museum's collection.

While working in the Badari region 1923–24 she took the initiative to explore prehistoric settlement remains at Hemamieh. Caton Thompson's work at the site was distinguished by its meticulousness. Caton Thompson began her work by organizing the site into ten by thirty foot intervals. She carefully excavated in arbitrary six-inch levels, and recorded the exact position of each artifact. Along with her excavation techniques, Caton Thompson was also the first to use air surveys to locate archaeological sites. Such approaches to excavation were in many respects a generation ahead of her time and "sets her apart from her contemporaries and the majority of her successors".

In 1925 Caton Thompson and the geologist Elinor Wight Gardner began the first archaeological and geological survey of the northern Faiyum, where they sought to correlate ancient lake levels with archaeological stratification. Caton Thompson found the earliest farming civilization to date in the Fayum region of Egypt, estimated to about 4000 B.C. They continued working in the Faiyum over the next two years for the Royal Anthropological Institute where they discovered two unknown Neolithic cultures, mainly based on evidence from their Kom K and Kom W excavations.

Caton Thompson and Wight Gardner also worked on prehistoric sites at Kharga Oasis in 1930. Her publication of "Kharga Oasis in Prehistory" was the first publication of the new Athlone Press of the University of London. Also the flints she was allowed to bring back to London are permanently housed in the Institute of Archaeology in London.  This led to research more broadly on the palaeolithic civilizations of north Africa, which Caton Thompson published in 1952. Caton Thompson made her first visit to the Kharga Oasis in 1928 during her expedition to the Zimbabwe excavations. There were three expeditions to the Kharga Oasis from 1930 to 1933. Elinor Gardner did the surveying for many of the excavations. Caton Thompson had to excavate only for Paleolithic artifacts because there was such a variety of prehistoric civilizations at the Kharga Oasis including Neolithic artifacts. Caton Thompson determined that the Kharga Scarp contained water without rainfall, which helped to supply water to a Neolithic civilization. Since the Kharga Scarp contained many Paleolithic sites, she was able to excavate many implements used by those civilizations.

Great Zimbabwe

In 1928, the British Academy invited Caton Thompson to investigate the origins of ruins in southeastern Zimbabwe near Lake Mutirikwe. The site contained three sets of structures which contained multiple buildings. Known since the 16th century, Great Zimbabwe had been previously excavated by James Theodore Bent and David Randall-MacIver and controversy raged as to whether the site was the work of Africans (MacIver's view) or of some other civilisation. Caton Thompson assembled an all female expedition for the Zimbabwe excavations, which was the first of its kind. Caton Thompson used ceramics, which were similar to what modern villagers were using, and structures like terrace walls to determine who built the structures from the site. Working with Kathleen Kenyon, Caton Thompson's excavations led her to the unequivocal view that Zimbabwe was the product of a "native civilisation". The assertion attracted considerable negative press attention and was received negatively by many within the archaeological community. She received hate mail from Victor Loret and Alfred Charles Auguste Foucher, whose views on the Great Zimbabwe she challenged. Caton Thompson claimed to keep hostile letters from local experts in a file marked "insane". Modern archaeologists now agree that the city was the product of a Shona-speaking African civilisation.

Later life
In 1932, she employed Mary Leakey to illustrate her book The Desert Fayum, greatly influencing her later career in paleoanthropology. Towards the end of 1937 Caton Thompson and Elinor Gardner, accompanied by Freya Stark, initiated the first systematic excavation in the Yemen at Hadhramaut. However, relations between Caton Thompson and Stark were notoriously strained, with Stark deriding an anonymous but identifiable female archaeologist in her book A Winter in Arabia in 1940.

Caton Thompson retired from fieldwork after the Second World War. A long time friend of Dorothy Hoare, a colleague from Cambridge, Caton Thompson bought and shared a house with Hoare. After Hoare married Jose "Toty" M. de Navarro, another Cambridge lecturer in archaeology, the Navarros continued to share the house with Caton Thompson. When she and the Navarros retired from academic life in 1956, Caton Thompson moved with them to their home in Broadway, Worcestershire - Court Farm. Caton Thompson went on to have her memoirs release as an autobiography entitled "Mixed Memoirs" in 1983. She would reside with them and their son, Michael for the rest of her life. She died in 1985, in her 97th year at Broadway, Worcestershire.

Honours and accolades 
In 1938 she was offered the post of Disney Professor of Archaeology at Cambridge but rejected the role which was subsequently accepted by Dorothy Garrod. However, she was a research fellow at Newnham College, Cambridge in 1923 and honorary fellow from 1934 to 1945, receiving an honorary LittD in 1954. She was the first female President of the Prehistoric Society from 1940 to 1946, whilst also being elected a fellow of the British Academy in 1944. Caton Thompson was also elected to the vice presidency of the Royal Anthropological Institute in 1944. She received the Huxley Medal from the Royal Anthropological Institute in 1946. In 1934 Caton Thompson was also the first woman to receive the Rivers Medal from the Royal Anthropological Institute. In 1961 she was a founding member of the British School of History and Archaeology in East Africa and was made an honorary fellow after serving on the council for 10 years.

Publications
Guy Brunton, G. Caton Thompson, The Badarian civilisation and predynastic remains near Badari, British School of Archaeology in Egypt, London 1928.
The Zimbabwe Culture, 1931; F. Cass, 1970
Gertrude Caton Thompson, Elinor Wight Gardner The Desert Fayum, Royal Anthropological Institute of Great Britain and Ireland, 1934. 
The Tombs and Moon Temple of Hureidha (Hadhramaut), Oxford for the Society of Antiquaries, 1944
Kharga Oasis in Prehistory, University of London, 1952
Mixed memoirs, Paradigm Press, 1983

Notes and references

External links
 Gertrude Caton Thompson (1888–1985), Archaeologist papers at the Cambridge University Faculty of Asian and Middle Eastern Studies
 "Gertrude Caton Thompson" , Distinguished Women 1997
"Gertrude Caton Thompson: Society Girl, Suffragist and Scientific Archaeologist", TrowelBlazers2013

1888 births
1985 deaths
20th-century archaeologists
20th-century British scientists
20th-century British women scientists
British archaeologists
Fellows of the British Academy
Fellows of Newnham College, Cambridge
English archaeologists
British women archaeologists